Whindersson Nunes Batista (born 5 January 1995) is a Brazilian comedian and YouTuber known for his comedy videos since 2013.

In October 2016, his YouTube channel whinderssonnunes became the most subscribed in Brazil, but it was eventually surpassed by Canal KondZilla in February 2018. His channel is currently the 37th most-subscribed channel on YouTube (excluding YouTube generated topics), at 42.3 million subscribers and 3.79 billion views (as of 8 May 2021), and 2nd most subscribed Youtube channel from Brazil.

Personal life

Whindersson Nunes Batista was born in Palmeira do Piauí and grew up in Bom Jesus, Piauí. At the age of fifteen he decided that he wanted to make videos for YouTube. He did several attempts to get his channel recognized, but they were not successful. However, shortly thereafter he returned to producing videos for the channel, and the videos began to receive more views, and it was when he launched the parody Alô vó, tô reprovado in 2012, which within a week received five million views. Whindersson then moved to Teresina. He had no place to live, but was invited by the YouTuber Bob Nunes to live with his (Bob's) family in a neighborhood in the northern part of the city. From there on the channel began to rise in popularity, however, on 20 January 2013, the channel was hacked and deleted. After this occurrence, Whindersson created a new channel on 21 January 2013, that still exists as of 2021.

On 28 February 2018, Whindersson and his girlfriend, Luísa Sonza, got married in a religious ceremony in a Catholic chapel with sea view, in Alagoas, Brazil.

On 29 April 2020, through a post on Instagram, Whinderson announced his divorce, claiming that Luisa and he had grown apart but remain good friends.

Career

2013–present: YouTube and cinema 
The channel currently has around 42.3 million subscribers, over 3 billion views, and more than 380 videos. The channel has many types of content: from parodies, vlogs, songwriting to movie reviews. Its main marks are its simplistic editing, scenery and costumes used by Whindersson, who almost always is shirtless in a messy room, without any type of editing besides cuts. He always starts his videos with the phrase: "Hey guys watching my channel, how are you?" He humorously portrays subjects of his day-to-day life and childhood. The channel is currently the second most influential YouTube channel, according to research by Snack Intelligence. The most watched video of the channel is the parody entitled WHAT IS THE WIFI PASSWORD – Parody Adele – Hello, that exceeds 69 million views.

Whindersson Nunes also does acting and stand-up. He's in the cast of "The Penetras 2" with Pc Siqueira, Júlio Cocielo and Maju Trindade as newcomers in the cast and the veterans are: Mariana Ximenes, Marcelo Adnet and Eduardo Sterblitch. Whindersson Nunes is also in the cast called "Internet – The Movie", along with other famous youtubers, among them: Kéfera Buchmann, Christian Figueiredo and Rafinha Bastos.

The channel hit 10 million subscribers on 14 July 2016, making it the second most subscribed channel in Brazil, behind only to Porta dos Fundos, later surpassing them to become the most subscribed channel of Brazil less than three months later. In the same year, Snack Intelligence, division of the channel Snack network on YouTube that monitors and analyzes the digital audiovisual market, determined Whindersson was the second most influential YouTuber in the world, behind only Felix Arvid Ulf Kjellberg, popularly known as PewDiePie. In addition, a survey released by Google, made in partnership by Provokers and Meio & Mensagem consultants, revealed that Whindersson is the second most influential Brazilian personality among 14- to 17-year-olds in Brazil, behind only Luciano Huck.

Boxing career

Amateur career

Nunes vs Silva
In September 2019, Whindersson made his amateur boxing debut against Mario Silva in a boxing match for New Champion 2: Grandes Combates in Alphaville, São Paulo, Brazil on September 28. On the night of the fight, Nunes won his amateur bout against Silva.

Exhibition bouts

Freitas vs Nunes
On 30 January 2022, Nunes fought WBO super featherweight champion Acelino Freitas in an exhibition bout at the Duo Art Ice, Alphaville in São Paulo, Brazil. The fight ended in a draw after Nunes suffered a horror cut but was able to cling on to hear the final bell after eight rounds.

High Stakes Tournament 
On 7 March 2023, it was announced that Whindersson had signed a multi fight deal with Kingpyn Boxing to compete in the High Stakes Tournament. On March 12 at the Kingpyn Launch Party, Whindersson has matched up with the TBC fighter for the quarter final of the Kingpyn High Stakes Tournament at Wembley Arena in London on 22 April.

Boxing record

Exhibition

Amateur

References

1995 births
Living people
Brazilian male comedians
Brazilian YouTubers
People from Piauí
YouTube boxers